Joan Fitzgerald (or FitzGerald) may refer to:

 Joan FitzGerald, Countess of Carrick (1282–1320), daughter of John FitzThomas FitzGerald, 1st Earl of Kildare
 Joan Fitzgerald, Countess of Ormond (died 1565), daughter of James Fitzgerald, 10th Earl of Desmond
 Joan Fitz-Gerald (born 1948), former president of the Colorado Senate